Boris Leonidovich Zapryagaev (28 February 1922 – 20 April 2000) was a Russian ice hockey goaltender. Initially playing bandy, Zapryagaev later competed in ice hockey for Krylya Sovetov Moscow from 1947 to 1961, playing about 270 games for them in the Soviet Championship League. He received the title of Merited Master of Sports of the USSR in ice hockey in 1954, and won the national championship in 1956-57. He later served as a coach for Krylya.

Zapryagaev also played association football, suiting up for Perm (1941-1943), Krylya Sovetov Moscow (1943-1948), Torpedo Moscow (1949-1952), and Krylya Sovetov/Zenith Kuibyshev (1953).

References

1922 births
2000 deaths
Honoured Masters of Sport of the USSR
Soviet ice hockey goaltenders
Ice hockey people from Moscow